Armin Suppan (born 16 October 1959) is an Austrian brass musician and composer.

Life 
Born in Graz, son of the musicologist Wolfgang Suppan, Suppan studied music at the University of Music and Performing Arts Graz as well as at the Hochschule für Musik Detmold. In 1984, he received his diploma in French horn training with Michael Hoeltzel. In 1987, he completed additional studies in conducting and chamber music with Walter Hügler in Biel and Milan Turković in Vienna. Initially active as a conductor of wind orchestras in the South Baden area of Kappelrodeck, Ortenberg, he began his military bandmaster training in Austria in 1994. In 1999, Suppan passed the military bandmaster examination. Suppan has gained international recognition as wind music expert and instrumentator for Symphonic Wind Orchestra.

Compositions 
 Johann-Joseph-Fux-Suite, Freiburg 1987, Schulz.
 Rondo für Schulorchester, für solistische Bläser und Streichquartett, Freiburg 1988, Schulz (Musik aus der Steiermark, issue 128).
 Schlossberg-Hymne, Freiburg 1988, Schulz.
 Wiener Barock-Ouvertüre, Bad Aussee 1993, Adler.
 Ortenberg-Fanfare, Bad Aussee 1996, Adler.
 Nordpol-Fanfare, Bad Aussee 1997, Adler.
 Dream Day. Festlicher Tagesanbruch, Bad Aussee 1998, Adler.
 Etüden und Vortragsstücke für Waldhorn, Freiburg 1980, Schulz.

Writings 
 Kongreßbericht Banská Bystrica 1998.
 Repertorium der Märsche für Blasorchester. 2 volumes, Tutzing 1982 and 1990 (Alta musica 6 and 13).
 Das Neue Lexikon des Blasmusikwesens. (with Wolfgang Suppan), 4th edition, Freiburg 1994, .

References

External links 
 
 

20th-century classical composers
Austrian composers
Austrian musicians
1959 births
Living people
Composers from Graz